Dum Dum is a city and a municipality of North 24 Parganas district in the Indian state of West Bengal. It is a part of the area covered by Kolkata Metropolitan Development Authority (KMDA) and a vital locality in Kolkata Metropolitan Area.

Etymology
During the 19th century the area was home to the Dum Dum Arsenal, a British Royal Artillery facility. It was here that, in the early 1890s, Captain Neville Bertie-Clay developed a bullet with the jacket cut away at the tip to reveal its soft lead core (see hollow-point bullet), known informally as a dum-dum or more correctly as an expanding bullet. The previous name of Dum Dum was "Domdoma".

Some resources claim that the Persian word damdama, which means "mound" or "elevated battery," is the source of the word Dum Dum.

History
Dum Dum was sparsely populated before the British came. The area was slightly elevated. On 6 February 1757, an accord was signed at Dum Dum by the Nawab of Bengal to allow the British to build forts at Calcutta, Dacca and Kashim Bazar. In 1783 a cantonment was established at Dum Dum. Military barracks were built and civilians started coming in to provide essential services to the military personnel. A Cantonment Board was formed to provide civic amenities. The ordnance factory was established at Dum Dum in 1846. It may be noted that both North Dum Dum Municipality and South Dum Dum Municipality were established in 1870 thereby somewhat defining administratively the different parts of an earlier undefined Dum Dum "area".

Dum Dum was a separate subdivision for a short period (See Barrackpore subdivision for more information). During the early years of the cantonment the British waged several imperial wars, out of which the wars in Burma, Nepal, the Deccan and Afganisthan were costly in blood and lives. Two monuments were erected to commemorate their memory. During the 1857 disturbances the Indian sepoys posted at Dum Dum were affected and Mangal Pandey was hanged from a tree at Dum Dum cantonment (he/ his dead body was probably hanged at both Barrackpore and Dum Dum). Dum Dum cantonment was closed down and the Cantonment Board was replaced by Dum Dum Municipality in 1929. The temporary set back to Dum Dum arising from abolition of the cantonment and departure of British troops, was partially made up with the shifting of Jessop & Co. from Howrah to Dum Dum in 1928 and establishment of the Gramophone Company at Dum Dum in 1929. Bengal Flying Club, established in 1920, had a small fleet of single engine moth planes. The independence movement led to the sudden development of the Central Jail, where many top leaders and more numerous unknown patriots were lodged. The old military barracks made way for multi-storied jail barracks. The environment quite often reverberated with the chanting of Vande Mataram.

With the partition of Bengal in 1947, "millions of refugees poured in from erstwhile East Pakistan." In the initial stages bulk of the refugees were non-agriculturists. A few of them made their own arrangements, but "it was squatters who made the East Bengali refugees famous or infamous." Squatting (jabardakhal in Bengali) ranged from the forcible occupation of barracks to the collective take-over of private, government and waste land. "This happened as early as 1948 with middle class refugees in the Jadavpur area: first on government land and then on private property, leading to violent clashes. Having won the battle, the elated squatters named their colony ‘Bijaygarh’, the Fort of Victory." By 1949, there were 40 such colonies in Jadavpur, Kasba, Santoshpur, Garia and Behala, in the south-eastern part of the city, and 65 in the Dum Dum and Panihati zone in the north. Subsequently squatters colonies also came up along the west bank of the Hooghly and by 1950, there were 150 such colonies. It has to be borne in mind that the squatters were in a way "self-settlers" in the absence of adequate official arrangements for rehabilitation. Within a very short time the refugees (quite often with government/ administrative support) not only found a place to stay but developed a society with markets, schools, temples and sometimes even colleges, hospitals and recreational centres. Efforts have been made in more recent years to regularise land/property rights in the refugee colonies.

Geography

Location

It has an average elevation of 11 metres (36 feet).

Dum Dum is bounded by North Dum Dum (municipality) on the north and partly on the west, Bidhannagar Municipal Corporation area on the east and South Dum Dum (municipality) on the south and partly on the west.

96% of the population of Barrackpore subdivision (partly presented in the map alongside, all places marked on the map are linked in the full screen map) lives in urban areas. In 2011, it had a density of population of 10,967 per km2 The subdivision has 16 municipalities and 24 census towns.

For most of the cities/ towns information regarding density of population is available in the Infobox. Population data is not available for neighbourhoods. It is available for the entire municipal area and thereafter ward-wise.

Police station
Dum Dum police station under Barrackpore Police Commissionerate has jurisdiction over Dum Dum and parts of South Dum Dum municipal areas.

Demographics

Population
Per the 2011 Census of India, Dum Dum had a total population of 114,786, of which 58,566 (51%) were males and 56,220 (49%) were females. Population below 6 years was 8,259. The total number of literates was 97,997 (91.99% of the population over 6 years). As of 2001 India census, Dum Dum had a population of 102,319. Males constitute 52% of the population and females 48%. Dum Dum has an average literacy rate of 82%, higher than the national average of 59.5%: Male literacy is 85% and female literacy is 78%. In Dum Dum, 8% of the population is under 6 years of age.

Kolkata Urban Agglomeration
The following municipalities, census towns, and other locations in Barrackpore subdivision were part of Kolkata Urban Agglomeration in the 2011 census: Kanchrapara (M), Jetia (CT), Halisahar (M), Balibhara (CT), Naihati (M), Bhatpara (M), Kaugachhi (CT), Garshyamnagar (CT), Garulia (M), Ichhapur Defence Estate (CT), North Barrackpur (M), Barrackpur Cantonment (CB), Barrackpore (M), Jafarpur (CT), Ruiya (CT), Titagarh (M), Khardaha (M), Bandipur (CT), Panihati (M), Muragachha (CT) New Barrackpore (M), Chandpur (CT), Talbandha (CT), Patulia (CT), Kamarhati (M), Baranagar (M), South Dum Dum (M), North Dum Dum (M), Dum Dum (M), Noapara (CT), Babanpur (CT), Teghari (CT), Nanna (OG), Chakla (OG), Srotribati (OG), and Panpur (OG).

Economy

Industry

The following industrial units are located in Dum Dum:
 Ordnance Factory Dum Dum is a modern factory with unique high precision machining system such as Laser cutting Machine, CNC operated Injection Moulding Machine and CNC Machines for carrying out stringent quality products. The factory was initiated when Robert Clive recaptured Calcutta from Siraj ud-Daulah, the Nawab of Bengal, in 1757. It became the first development centre for defence stores in India established by the Royal forces. When the Gun & Shell Factory was established at Cossipore it worked in tandem with the Gun & Shell Factory. After the disastrous First Anglo-Afghan War, the first Ammunition Factory in British India was set up here. It produced the dumdum bullets. The 1857 mutiny was sparked by inputs from this factory. The site was also used as a jail and many freedom fighters were hung here. Hearsay includes the Santal leader Kanhu Murmu. The Ammunition Factory was shifted to Pune in 1869, but the ordnance factory continued to function at Dum Dum.
 Jessop & Company, located at Dum Dum, is a leading engineering company since 1788, when Breen & Company was founded in Calcutta. In 1820, Henry and George, sons of William Jessop, acquired, on behalf of Butterley Company, Breen & Company. Butterley Company was founded in Derbyshire, England.  Butterley Company and Breen & Company merged to form Jessop & Company in 1820. The company was a pioneer in the engineering field and had many feathers in its cap. During 1815-40 it built the first iron bridge (loha-ka-pul) in India, across the Gomti at Lucknow. It floated the first steam boat in Indian waters in 1819, manufactured the first steam roller for Indian roads in 1890, and produced the first electrical multiple unit (EMU) coach for Indian railways in 1959. In 1973, the company was taken over by the Government of India and in 1986, it became a subsidiary of the holding company Bharat Bhari Udyog Nigam. In 2003, as part of the strategic disinvestment of the NDA government, the Kolkata-based Ruia Group, headed by Pawan Kumar Ruia, took charge of loss-making Jessop. Pawan Kumar Ruia has successfully turned around Jessop.

 The Dum Dum recording studio of Saregama, a part of the factory with production facilities, was established in 1928. It holds "around 30,000 master tapes of original Indian music recorded by the company since Gauhar Jaan sang raga Jogiya in Kolkata and became the first Indian voice to be recorded on shellac disc in 1902."  In the studio "text and photographs of artistes from Hindustani and Carnatic classical, Hindi and south Indian playback, devotional and Bengali music, who have recorded with the company, are also exhibited along with a copy of the original agreement that Tagore signed with the company before cutting his first musical record at the Dum Dum studio in 1928." The tapes are in at least 19 major Indian languages. The collection includes speeches of Mahatma Gandhi, Jawaharlal Nehru and Subhas Chandra Bose. In the world of music the list is too long for elaboration here but it includes the voice of Kazi Nazrul Islam. It is a simple, "You name it and it is there." Saregama of the RP-Sanjiv Goenka Group under the chairmanship of Sanjiv Goenka, were the successors to the Gramophone Company of India (possibly better known for their His Master's Voice or HMV logo) was among the first overseas branches of the British record firm, Electric and Music Industries (EMI).

Infrastructure

As per the District Census Handbook 2011, Dum Dum municipal city covered an area of 9.23 km2. Amongst the civic amenities it had open drains. Amongst the medical facilities It had 13 medicine shops. Amongst the educational facilities it had 31 primary schools, 10 secondary schools, 19 senior secondary schools, 1 degree college for arts/science/commerce and 77 non-formal education centres. Amongst the social, recreational and cultural facilities it had 10 auditorium/ community halls, 11 public libraries and 1 reading room. Amongst the commodities manufactured were rail wagons, gun and shell and music CD. It had 6 bank branches.

KMDA
Dum Dum municipality is included in the Kolkata Metropolitan Area for which the KMDA is the statutory planning and development authority.

Transport
Dum Dum Cantonment and Durganagar railway stations are on the Sealdah-Bangaon line.

NH 12 (previously NH 34) running from Dalkhola to Bakkhali, locally popular as Jessore Road, passes through Dum Dum.

A large number of Buses ply along Jessore road: 3C/1, 3C/2, 30D, 79B, 91, 91A, 93, 211A, 219, DN8, DN18, S10, Esplanade-Central Jail Mini, Bagbazar-Birohi, R.G.Kar-Barasat, Rajchandrapur-Saltlake white bus etc. The minor road on which bus plies is Gorabazar-Dum Dum Cantonment Road (30D).

Travel within Dum Dum and South Dum Dum

There are a plenty of blue-yellow private buses, mini-buses and taxis, as well as a few WBTC buses in Dum Dum. Autos are plentiful and can be used for short stretches.
Nagerbazar is the hub of autos where there are 4 routes originates viz:

 Nagerbazar – Dum Dum Junction
 Nagerbazar – Dum Dum Cantt
 Nagerbazar – Airport 1 no. gate
 Nagerbazar – Laketown

In addition, there are taxis: Nagerbazar and Dum Dum Airport are the largest taxi stands. The other popular means of travel over short distances is the rickshaw, newly battery operated rickshaws/e-rickshaws (locally called Totos) can also be seen.

Education

The following institutions are located in Dum Dum:

 Sarojini Naidu College for Women was established at Dum Dum in 1956. It offers honours courses in Bengali, English, Sanskrit, geography, history, philosophy, political science, economics, botany, chemistry, mathematics, philosophy, zoology and anthropology.
 Kendriya Vidyalaya Ordnance Factory Dum Dum was established in 1986, for the children of employees of the Ordnance Factory Dum Dum, defence personnel and other central government offices. It has arrangements for teaching from Classes I to XII. A co-educational day school, it functions under Kendriya Vidyalaya Sangthan and prepares students for CBSE examinations through Hindi and English mediums.
 Auxilium Convent School at Rajbari, Dum Dum, is an English-medium girls only school run by Salesian Sisters. Established in 1960, it prepares students for the ISC and ICSE examinations. Admission eligibility for LKG is 3 years age on 31 March.
 St. Mary's Orphanage & Day School, Kolkata at Dum Dum road near Dum Dum station.  It is a convent school run by the missionaries of Ireland.  This school was one of oldest schools in West Bengal and also one of the biggest.  Its campus contains 2 big fields and a basketball court, swimming pool, ice skating rink.  This school was founded by Edmund Ignatius Rise in 1848.  This school was earlier an hostel but it was withdrawn in 2004.  This school has 4 houses.  Eventually Mother Teresa was a teacher in this school of Geography and History.  Presently the school principal is Br. Placid Herniquess.

Healthcare
Dum Dum Municipal Specialised Hospital at 4 Hari Mohan Dutta Road, Dum Dum Cantonment, has been modernised and updated with the objective of offering treatment on par with the best medical facilities in Kolkata. It has 105 beds. It has experienced doctors (4 doctors are available round-the-clock), qualified nurses, technicians and staff. It specialises in pace-maker implantation, total knee replacement, spinal surgery and has cardiac ambulance facility.

Dum Dum Central Jail Hospital functions with 100 beds.

See also
 Dum Dum Arsenal
 Dum-dum bullets
 Dum-dum fever
 List of reduplicated place names

References

External links

 
 Kolkata Airport (CCU)

Cities and towns in North 24 Parganas district
Neighbourhoods in Kolkata
Kolkata Metropolitan Area
Cities in West Bengal